Holy Fuck is the 2005 eponymous debut release from Canadian electronica band Holy Fuck.  Tracks 1 & 5 were recorded 9 November 2004 by Laurence Currie at Idea of East, Halifax, Nova Scotia.  The remainder of the album was recorded 21 January 2005 by Dave Newfeld at Stars & Suns, Toronto, Ontario. All the tracks were mixed by Laurence Currie.

Track listing
"Tone Bank Jungle" – 6:34
"Korock" – 4:25
"Korg Rhythm Afro" – 6:48
"Casio Bossa Nova" – 6:26
"Tonebank Computer" – 7:08
"Bontempi Latin" – 4:53
"K.Rhythm Pt.1" – 5:14
"K.Rhythm Pt.2" – 9:10

References

External links

 Holy Fuck

2005 debut albums
Holy Fuck albums